The Roman Catholic Diocese of Fukuoka is a diocese located in Fukuoka in the Ecclesiastical province of Nagasaki 長崎 in Japan.

History
 July 16, 1927: Established as Diocese of Fukuoka from the Diocese of Nagasaki

Ordinaries
Fernand-Jean-Joseph Thiry, M.E.P. † (14 Jul 1927 Appointed - 10 May 1930 Died) 
Albert Henri Charles Breton, M.E.P. † (9 Jun 1931 Appointed - 16 Jan 1941 Resigned) 
Dominic Senyemon Fukahori † (9 Mar 1944 Appointed - 15 Nov 1969 Retired) 
Peter Saburo Hirata, P.S.S. † (15 Nov 1969 Appointed - 6 Oct 1990 Retired) 
Joseph Hisajiro Matsunaga † (6 Oct 1990 Appointed - 2 Jun 2006 Died) 
Dominic Ryoji Miyahara (19 Mar 2008 Appointed - 27 Apr 2019 Resigned)
Josep Maria Abella Batlle (14 Apr 2020 Appointed- Present)

See also
Roman Catholicism in Japan

Sources
 GCatholic.org
 Catholic Hierarchy

External links 
 http://www.cbcj.catholic.jp/jpn/diocese/fukuoka.htm

Roman Catholic dioceses in Japan
Christian organizations established in 1927
Roman Catholic dioceses and prelatures established in the 20th century